The Sri Lanka Railways W2 is a class of  diesel-hydraulic locomotives built by LEW Hennigsdorf for Sri Lanka Railways.

Description

Introduction 

15 Class W2 locomotives were developed by LEW Hennigsdorf including a prototype according to the order placed by Sri Lanka Railways. 14 locomotives were delivered to Sri Lanka in 1969. Prototype locomotive was kept with the builder. Later by 1972, prototype locomotive also was delivered to Sri Lanka. First locomotive fleet were allocated the numbers  703 to 716. Last locomotive delivered was given the number 729.

Operation 

The class were used for working passenger and freight services on the SLR Main Line.

Declination 
By 80's with the introduction of new locomotives, W2s were taken out of passenger services and were used on freight services. These have been on regular services until 1985. By 90's Most of locomotives were condemned due to technical failures. Some were scrapped.

Class W2A
In 2015, SLR rebuilt W2 715. The new version has Paxman Valenta V12 prime mover. This is painted in a new livery. This locomotive is now in regular operations.

See also 

Diesel locomotives of Sri Lanka
Sri Lanka Railways W3

References 

W2
Railway locomotives introduced in 1969
5 ft 6 in gauge locomotives